Sekiji-ike is an earthfill dam located in Ehime Prefecture in Japan. The dam is used for irrigation. The catchment area of the dam is 3.2 km2. The dam impounds about 10  ha of land when full and can store 1000 thousand cubic meters of water. The construction of the dam was started on 1952 and completed in 1961.

References

Dams in Ehime Prefecture
1961 establishments in Japan